King of The Netherlands (Dutch: Koning der Nederlanden) is the title of the Dutch head of state. The king serves as the head of state of the Kingdom of the Netherlands, which includes the constituent nations of the Netherlands, Curaçao, Aruba, and Sint Maarten. The king is also the president of the Council of State.

Furthermore, the king is the head of the Royal House. Besides him, it consists of a few direct relatives. Membership is specified by law (Wet lidmaatschap Koninklijk Huis, 2002). This is to be distinguished from the much larger Royal Family with all of the relatives.

Originally the Dutch monarch acted as an absolute ruler. However, during the 19th century, the monarch's power was severely restricted. In theory, the Dutch monarch has many powers, but in practice serves a ceremonial role.

Terminology, title and lineage 

In the Dutch constitution, the Head of State appears as the Koning. Before the constitutional reform in 1983, in many places, this was called the Kroon, which sometimes referred to the king as an individual, and sometimes to the government. But there are still some places in which Koning or Koninklijk actually refers to the government. A Koninklijk besluit, a royal decree, is, however, not a decision made by the king, but by the government (which consists of the king and the ministers). The constitution does not explicitly name the king as the Head of State, but this is taken for granted.

Dutch laws (except the constitution) are preceded by a preamble, mentioning the king as follows:
Wij Willem-Alexander, bij de gratie Gods, Koning der Nederlanden, Prins van Oranje-Nassau, enz. enz. enz.
We, Willem-Alexander, by the grace of God, King of the Netherlands, Prince of Orange-Nassau, etc., etc., etc.
In addition to the title of Prince of Orange, the king has many other titles, even if they are no longer used:
	
 Margrave of Veere and Vlissingen
 Count of Katzenelnbogen, Vianden, Diez, Spiegelberg, Buren, Leerdam and Culemborg
 Burgrave of Antwerpen
 Baron of Breda, Diest, Beilstein, the city of Grave, Land van Cuijk, IJsselstein, Cranendonck, Eindhoven, Liesveld, Herstal, Waasten, Arlay and Nozeroy
 Lord of Ameland
 Lord of Baarn, Besançon, Borculo, Bredevoort, Bütgenbach, Dasburg, Geertruidenberg, Hooge en Lage Zwaluwe, Klundert, Lichtenvoorde, Het Loo, Montfort, Naaldwijk, Niervaart, Polanen, Steenbergen, Sint-Maartensdijk, Sankt Vith, Soest, Ter Eem, Turnhout, Willemstad, Zevenbergen
In the past, there used to be other titles, such as the Duke of Limburg.

The constitution uses the term Koning (king). However, in the sense of the constitution, a king can also be a woman. In 1891, a law was established: if a woman wears the crown, the term Koning is to be replaced with Koningin (queen) in all official documents.

For spouses, there is the following disparity: the wife of a male head of state may bear the title of Queen, as does Queen Máxima, the wife of King Willem-Alexander. This stems from tradition. The husband of a female head of state, however, is not allowed to call himself king; instead, he has to make do with the title of Prince Consort (prins-gemaal) or Prince of the Netherlands. Otherwise, the wrong impression could be created, that the husband of the queen is a king in the sense of the constitution. For example, Queen Beatrix’s husband was only Prince Consort Claus.

Function 
The Dutch government consists of the king and the ministers. Since 1848 it has been specified in the constitution that the king is onschendbaar (inviolable) and the ministers bear responsibility. The position of the king is expressed, among other things, in the signing of laws and royal decrees (of the government), each of which is signed by a minister or secretary of state. At the end of the formation of a government, the king signs the decrees appointing the minister and secretary of state, who are then sworn in before him.

According to the decree, the king is the president of the Raad van State. However, this is a purely ceremonial and symbolic function. The vice-president of the Council of State is responsible for running official business.

Until 2012, after parliamentary elections, the king would appoint an informateur or formateur, who would form the government. Since then, this role has been held by the Speaker of the House of Representatives. However, the king is to be informed about the results of these processes and about government work in general.

Once a year, the king reads out the speech from the throne (on Prinsjesdag in September), which is written by the cabinet.

The king also has the same function in the three other countries of the kingdom, in Aruba, Curaçao, and Sint Maarten. Because the king lives in the Netherlands, he is represented by a governor in each of these three countries. The king officially appoints the governor of each country, and while his approval is technically still required for the appointment, the king today plays no role in the selection of the governors.

Ministerial responsibility 
Ministerial responsibility is characteristic of a constitutional monarchy like the Netherlands. According to the constitution, the king is inviolable, and the ministers are responsible. An act of the king does not become official unless it has been countersigned by a minister. Thereby, the ministers assume responsibility. 

Since 1841, the king has been supported by the king’s cabinet in exercising his constitutional duties. This office (not to be confused with the government cabinet) regulates communications between the king and his ministers, as well as with other state organs. This office is also subject to ministerial responsibility.

The king is inviolable. This means that he cannot be held accountable for his actions by any state organ. This also applies to his actions as a private person. However, he can be prosecuted under civil law, for example, if he is to pay compensation. In such a case, the king is represented by an authorised representative. He must comply with criminal law, but he cannot be prosecuted (with one exception: by the International Criminal Court). The ministers then assume no criminal responsibility, but a political one. When it comes to very serious crimes, there can be calls for ministers to try to have the king declared incapacitated.

Representative tasks 
While the monarch still officially retains the responsibility of running the government, the position of the king is now mostly symbolic. 

The king is officially the physical embodiment of the Netherlands and is meant to be a symbol of social and political unity. 

Furthermore, the king represents the kingdom of the Netherlands internally and externally. He regularly makes working visits to provinces and municipalities and also travels to the Caribbean Netherlands. In addition, several state visits are on his agenda each year, and he greets heads of state and government leaders who are in turn visiting the Netherlands.

In addition, the king is a regular guest at conventions, opening ceremonies, jubilees, commemorations, and similar occasions. In this way, he draws attention to socially valuable initiatives and supports developments and activities that are useful in this context.

As a private individual 
The king is a normal person like everyone else. However, in some cases, different standards apply to him than to other Dutch citizens. For example, the law determines who becomes the guardian of an underage king. The guardianship does not have to be in the same hands as the regency. As a public official, some of the king's rights are limited.

The problem for the king is that it can be difficult to separate the private person and the office. In principle, a king is free to express his opinion, which includes his opinion about the government. As a public official, however, he is not allowed to do so. This initially applies only to public occasions. But something the king says in private can become public, and by doing so, it automatically becomes a statement of the king as a public official. The ministers must thus take responsibility towards parliament for all of the king's actions.

Succession 
 In terms of constitutional law, a distinction must be made on one hand between the king as a public official, and on the other hand, the office of the king, so the function of the koningschap (royalty). The office is to be distinguished from the koninklijk gezag, the royal powers.

One receives koningschap through succession, as the constitution depicts (Art. 24). Therefore, one must be the descendant of William I (the first public official in 1815). Succession occurs if a king either dies or abdicates from the koningschap.

A successor can only be a legal descendant of the king. Until 1983, this was the oldest son, and since then, the oldest child. The descendants of the king are considered first, followed by their parents or grandparents, and then their descendants. Even an unborn child can be an heir. A successor cannot be a person who has been legally barred from succession. The constitution stipulates a special procedure in parliament for this. Someone who marries without the consent of Parliament cannot become or remain king. This also applies to children from such a marriage. The so-called “Irene Question” (Dutch: kwestie Irene) caused a political crisis in 1964. It concerned whether a follower of the Roman Catholic religion could also ascend to the throne in the traditionally Protestant Netherlands. The context was the engagement of Princess Irene to the Spanish heir to the throne Carlos Hugo of Bourbon-Parma and her conversion to Catholicism. Irene’s renunciation of a possible successor to the throne and the transfer of the wedding to Rome meant that the question of the monarch’s faith was not answered conclusively.

One becomes king when one’s predecessor leaves office: for example, when Queen Wilhelmina abdicated, her daughter Juliana became the new queen at the very same moment. The successor cannot refuse succession in advance; the successor does not even have to agree to succession. Only when he has become king, can he abdicate. The new king also receives royal powers without any further action, i.e. without taking an oath.

However, someone can exercise the royal powers without themself becoming king, for example, a regent. This happened in 1890, when King Wilhelm III died, leaving behind a widow and an underage daughter. The daughter Wilhelmina inherited the koningschap at this time. But, the koninklijk gezag were exercised for eight years by the Dowager Queen Emma as regent. A king can temporarily give up his powers, for example, due to illness, and is likewise replaced by a regent. Furthermore, through laws and after consultation with the Raad van State, parliament may declare the king incapable of exercising his powers. Exceptionally, this law does not have to be signed by the king (Art 35 GW).

The regency is normally exercised by the suspected heir, provided they are of legal age; if there isn’t one, by law the parliament can appoint the regent. Around 1981, Prince Claus was designated for this, in case Queen Beatrix died before her sons became of age. Otherwise, the Raad van State would exercise the royal powers until a regent is appointed.

List of monarchs

See also 
 Monarchy of the Netherlands

References 

Dutch monarchy 
Royal titles